A440 (also known as Stuttgart pitch) is the musical pitch corresponding to an audio frequency of 440 Hz, which serves as a tuning standard for the musical note of A above middle C, or A4 in scientific pitch notation.  It is standardized by the International Organization for Standardization as ISO 16.  While other frequencies have been (and occasionally still are) used to tune the first A above middle C, A440 is now commonly used as a reference frequency to calibrate acoustic equipment and to tune pianos, violins, and other musical instruments.

History and use
Before standardization on 440 Hz, many countries and organizations followed the French standard since the 1860s of 435 Hz, which had also been the Austrian government's 1885 recommendation. Johann Heinrich Scheibler recommended A440 as a standard in 1834 after inventing the "tonometer" to measure pitch, and it was approved by the Society of German Natural Scientists and Physicians at a meeting in Stuttgart the same year.

The American music industry reached an informal standard of 440 Hz in 1926, and some began using it in instrument manufacturing.

In 1936, the American Standards Association recommended that the A above middle C be tuned to 440 Hz. This standard was taken up by the International Organization for Standardization in 1955 as Recommendation R 16, before being formalised in 1975 as ISO 16.

It is designated A4 in scientific pitch notation because it occurs in the octave that starts with the fourth C key on a standard 88-key piano keyboard. On MIDI, A440 is note 69 (0x45 hexadecimal).

Modern practices

A440 is widely used as concert pitch in the United Kingdom and the United States. In continental Europe the frequency of A4 commonly varies between 440 Hz and 444 Hz.
In the period instrument movement, a consensus has arisen around a modern baroque pitch of 415 Hz (with 440 Hz corresponding to A), a 'baroque' pitch for some special church music (in particular, some German church music, e.g. the pre-Leipzig period cantatas of Bach) known as Chorton pitch at 466 Hz (with 440 Hz corresponding to A), and classical pitch at 427–430 Hz.

A440 is often used as a tuning reference in just intonation regardless of the fundamental note or key.

The US time and frequency station WWV broadcasts a 440 Hz signal at two minutes past every hour, with WWVH broadcasting the same tone at the first minute past every hour. This was added in 1936 to aid orchestras in tuning their instruments.

See also 
 History of pitch standards in Western music
 Electronic tuner

References 

16
Musical tuning